Dean Daughtry (September 8, 1946 – January 26, 2023) was an American musician. He was the keyboard player with the Classics IV after Joe Wilson departed. They had a 1968 #3 US/#46 UK/#1 Can hit with "Spooky". He co-founded the Atlanta Rhythm Section in 1971, and was their sole constant member until retiring in 2020. They had two US top ten hits:  "So in to You" (in 1977) and "Imaginary Lover" (in 1978), both of which reached #7 on the Billboard Hot 100 survey, and #2 and #9 in Canada.

Daughtry was born in Kinston, Alabama. He died in Huntsville, Alabama, on January 26, 2023, at the age of 76.

References

External links
 
 

1946 births
2023 deaths
20th-century American keyboardists
Atlanta Rhythm Section members
People from Coffee County, Alabama